The 2002 Copper Fire was a wildfire in the U.S. state of California's Los Angeles County. After igniting on June 5 near the city of Santa Clarita, the fire burned for a week and consumed , damaging wildlife habitat and historic structures in the Angeles National Forest before it was fully contained on June 12. The fire destroyed more than two dozen buildings and resulted in at least eight firefighter injuries. The government eventually sued two contractors whose equipment and negligence it argued had sparked the fire during construction work, resulting in a jury award in its favor of over $36 million.

Background factors 
The fire burned in hot, dry, and windy conditions in medium-heavy brush in steep, inaccessible drainages, primarily in San Francisquito Canyon, in the Sierra Pelona Ridge region of the Transverse Ranges north of Los Angeles and south of the Antelope Valley.

Fire progression

Ignition 
The Copper Fire was ignited on June 5, 2002. That year, the Newhall County Water District had hired Merco Construction Engineers, Inc. as a general contractor to build four steel water reservoirs for a planned community housing project near Santa Clarita, California. Merco then subcontracted work out to CB&I Constructors, Inc., to build the reservoirs themselves. 

On the afternoon of June 5, an employee of CB&I was using an electric grinder, which produces a stream of sparks and slag as it smooths and grinds metal, to perform work on the roof of one of the reservoirs. CB&I offered its crews a financial bonus if they completed work more quickly than planned. Neither CB&I nor Merco took recommended fire prevention precautions, including clearing brush  from the tanks, spraying water on dry vegetation, or keeping someone on the ground to watch for fires while the rest of the crew worked on the roof. At approximately 2:40 p.m. PDT, sparks and hot metal fragments from the grinder landed in, and ignited nearby brush. The workers spotted the fire, but it was too large to control before they had even descended to the ground. 

Named for the street where it began (Copper Hill Road), the Copper Fire quickly expanded, burning northeast. By the end of the day, the fire had burned 1,500 acres, destroying eight (non-residential) buildings. Structure protection firefighter teams assembled in Green Valley, a rural community placed under a mandatory evacuation order.

June 6 
On the morning of June 6, the Copper Fire had burned 5,600 acres. It continued to grow as the combination of high temperatures, erratic winds, and difficult terrain drove containment down from 20% to 5% over the course of the day—this despite the efforts of a dozen aircraft and about 700-1,000 firefighters. As the fire burned, it began to threaten to overheat electric power transmission lines connecting Southern California to Northern California, which might have caused rolling blackouts. Indeed, heat from the fire caused one of the major lines to shut down, and a second was close to that point before the fire front began to shift away from the area. At 5:00 p.m., the head of the fire crested the hills above Green Valley, and an hour later a second flank of the fire entered the canyon as firefighters fought to protect the structures there, and were partially successful: by the end of the day, the fire had burned more than 15,600 acres and had added five homes to its toll.

June 7 – June 12 
On Friday, June 7, the Copper Fire had burned about 23,500 acres. Weather remained an issue, with hot temperatures, low humidity, and continued onshore winds of up to 20 miles per hour. To hem the fire in, firefighters set backfires along Spunky Canyon Road. By the end of the day, the fire was 15% contained, largely to San Francisquito and Bouquet Canyon, and a U.S. Forest Service spokesperson cautioned that it was "going to be another couple days before we get a handle on this." No further structure loss occurred, with over 2,000 firefighters were engaged along the 20 miles of fireline.

By the night of June 8, evacuees from Green Valley were allowed to return and total containment of the fire was assessed at 55%. The fire's size was unchanged from the previous day's figure of ~23,500 acres, and the difficult weather had eased; cooler temperatures, more humidity, and a marine layer prevailed over the fire area. The most active section of the fire was located near Spunky Canyon Road and Bouquet Reservoir, to the east of Green Valley.

A small flare-up on the fire perimeter occurred on June 10, but it was contained and the fire grew no larger than its approximate perimter on June 8.

Summary 

Impacts

Casualties 
The Copper Fire did not result in any fatalities, but at least nine firefighters sustained minor injuries.

Closures and evacuations 
A local emergency was declared on June 7. Approximately 2,000 people in the rural communities of Green Valley and Warm Springs, 10 miles north of Santa Clarita, were placed under mandatory evacuation orders because of the Copper Fire's threat to their communities. The American Red Cross established temporary shelters for evacuees at Saugus High School and Highland High School in Palmdale.

Damage 
The Copper Fire destroyed 26 structures, including at least nine homes. Structures that burned also included the entirety of the Hazel Dell Mining Camp, a historically significant abandoned graphite mine from the 1900s. All of the camp's wooden structures, including cabins, burned, and the two horizontal mining shafts collapsed. The damage was so extensive that the site became ineligible for listing on the National Register of Historic Places. The fire did an additional $330,000 in damage to county roads.

Environmental impacts 
The Copper Fire resulted in major environmental harms in the Angeles National Forest, particularly in San Francisquito Canyon. It destroyed nearly all the native vegetation in the area, resulting in an infestation of giant cane (Arundo donax), an invasive reed. The destruction of the vegetation also aided in erosion, tripling the rate of sedimentation in the San Francisquito Creek watershed as it filled with ash and debris. The fire and following floods also impacted over 90 percent of the endangered California red-legged frog's habitat in the Angeles National Forest: before the fire researchers had logged 250-500 adult frogs along San Francisquito Creek, a range which fell to 30-50 by 2009 and led to concerns among researchers about the lack of genetic diversity among the surviving population. The fire also impacted the unarmored three-spined stickleback (G. a. williamsoni) population, an endangered subspecies of fish, and "notably reduced" the population of Nevin's barberry (Mahonia nevinii), an at-risk endemic plant species. Lastly, the loss of vegetation resulted in an increase in illegal and ecologically harmful off-highway vehicle use in the area.

Litigation 
In 2008, the United States Attorney's Office for the Central District of California filed a lawsuit against Merco Construction Engineers, Inc. and CB&I Constructors, Inc., seeking to recover costs associated with fire suppression and environmental harms. According to the government's lawsuit, CB&I's negligence was responsible for the fire because the employee operating the electric grinder had directed sparks towards the flammable hillside, and Merco's negligence was also responsible because an employee of theirs who was supposed to be watering down the site to prevent fires "failed to adequately perform that task."

On September 30, 2009, after a week-long trial and a day-long federal jury deliberation, Merco and CB&I were ordered to collectively pay more than $36.4 million: ~$6.6 million for the cost of fire suppression; ~$500,000 for BAER costs; ~$500,000 for remediating burned infrastructure; and $28.8 million for environmental damages. CB&I was found to be 65 percent liable, and Merco found to be 35 percent liable. According to the Central District's press release, the penalty marked the largest ever such jury award in a federal firefighting cost-recovery case, and the first time a jury had awarded damages for environmental damages from a wildfire in the United States. Much larger settlements have resulted from other wildfires, including the 2000 Storrie Fire and the 2007 Moonlight Fire, but those settlements were not the outcome of a jury award.

See also 

 2002 California wildfires

References 

Wildfires in Los Angeles County, California
2002 California wildfires